Underwater search and recovery is the process of locating and recovering underwater objects, often by divers, but also by the use of submersibles, remotely operated vehicles and electronic equipment on surface vessels.

Most underwater search and recovery is done by professional divers as part of commercial marine salvage operations, military operations, emergency services, or law enforcement activities.

Minor aspects of search and recovery are also considered within the scope of recreational diving.

Professional search and recovery

The scope of professional search and recovery includes the following applications:
Marine archeology - search for artifacts of historical interest and importance, and where applicable the recovery of such artifacts for study.
Marine salvage - search for lost material of value and recovery thereof
Environmental protection - search for environmentally undesirable material and disposal thereof
Forensic S&R - search for and recovery of material relevant to police investigations
Emergency S&R - Search for and recovery of victims of accidents and disasters
Military S&R - Search and recovery related to military operations and material
Scientific S&R - search for objects of scientific interest, recovery of instrumentation and samples

Recreational search and recovery

Search and recovery diving is also frequently undertaken as part of recreational diving, and most diver training organisations have dedicated training courses on the subject.  Search and recovery is generally considered a more hazardous speciality diving course.

Underwater search and recovery used to form a mandatory component of the Advanced Open Water Diver training course for many North American diver training agencies, which, in addition to learning basic search and recover skills, also assisted in teaching students to cope with task loading.

Although the scale, value and equipment used in commercial and recreational search and recovery are enormously different, the basic premise remains the same in each case.

Search

Diver search

Underwater searches, much like above water searches, are designed around specific search patterns.  The most common forms of underwater search patterns are:
 Circular search
 Jackstay search
 Expanding square search
 "U" pattern search

The patterns are usually performed by divers in pairs or teams below the water, but they can also be conducted by use of a tender who may be a snorkeller at the surface, a person on a towing boat, or a person located on the shore.

In simple search operations, the patterns will usually be conducted by the divers simply looking visually for the object.  In more sophisticated search operations, underwater magnetometers or hand held sonar may be used.

Types

Diver training traditionally divides searches into two categories, specific and non-specific.

A specific search is an attempt to locate a known object in a known area where it was believed to be lost even if the time period is undefined, and the search terminates upon the location of the object.  The classic example of this would be an item lost overboard from a boat, which needs to be recovered.

A non-specific search is a search for either a type of object or anything valuable within the dive locale.  The discovery of a relevant object does not usually terminate the search until the entire search area has been covered, or the search terminates early for other reasons (air supply, no decompression limits, etc.).

ROV searches

Searches using non-visual methods
 A magnetometer is a device that measures magnetic field or magnetic dipole moment. Different types of magnetometers measure the direction, strength, or relative change of a magnetic field at a particular location. Magnetometers can be used as metal detectors: they can detect only magnetic (ferrous) metals, but can detect such metals at a much greater distance than conventional metal detectors which rely on conductivity; they are capable of detecting large ferrous objects over considerable distances.
Side-scan sonar
A dragline is a line which is towed ether across the bottom, or at a depth controlled by floats and weights, or hydrodynamically, by paravanes or otter-boards, that is intended to snag the target, indicating its position.
Cadaver dogs

Recovery

Recovery techniques depend upon the type and size of the object.

Smaller objects, such as a coin or camera, can simply be carried up by the diver. Anything heavier represents a material change to the diver's buoyancy control, and may put the diver at risk from an uncontrolled ascent if contact with the object is lost during ascent.

Medium-sized objects are normally recovered using a lifting bag, and students are trained in lifting bag technique. The most common hazard is entanglement with lines whilst filling the lifting bag from the diver's alternate air source. This risk, when coupled with the possibility of rapid ascent following the freeing of the object from suction caused by it resting upon the sea bed, can seriously compromise the safety of the recovery team if done improperly. Lift bags can be rated up to several tons, but these are beyond the capacity of most recreational divers. A cubic metre of air per tonne at ambient hydrostatic pressure is needed.

Significantly larger objects usually require specialised commercial lifting equipment, either a winch attached to a boat or platform, or specialised equipment to seal and inflate sunken vessels.

See also

References

Footnotes 

Underwater diving procedures
Emergency services